Sara Kaisa Lappalainen (née Kuivisto, born 17 August 1991) is a Finnish middle-distance runner. Kuivisto represented Finland at the 2019 World Championships in the 800 m and 1500 m without advancing from the first round in either. She represented Finland at the 2020 Olympic Games in the 800 m and the 1500 m setting national records in both running a 1:59.41 in semi-finals of the 800 m and a 4:02.35 in the semi-finals of the 1500 m.

International competitions

Personal Bests

References

1991 births
Living people
Finnish female middle-distance runners
World Athletics Championships athletes for Finland
People from Porvoo
Finnish Athletics Championships winners
Athletes (track and field) at the 2020 Summer Olympics
Olympic athletes of Finland
Sportspeople from Uusimaa